The County Championship is an annual rugby union competition in England between teams representing English counties.  After restructuring in 2007 the top tier of the Championship has been known as the Bill Beaumont Cup, after the trophy awarded to the competition winners was named in honour of Bill Beaumont, a former England and British & Irish Lions captain.  In 2017 the competition was officially known as Bill Beaumont Division 1, with teams also competing in Division 2 and Division 3, which prior to 2017 were known as the Plate and Shield competitions.

The Championship has a long history, being first officially recognised by the Rugby Football Union in 1889. The 2018 Championship was the 118th competition. The most successful county, Lancashire, has won the competition 25 times, followed by Gloucestershire (17) and Yorkshire (15). Lancashire (34) & Gloucestershire (33) have made the most appearances in contested finals.

On four occasions the tournament final has been tied at full-time and a second leg rematch has been played. Two of these rematches were also tied and on these occasions (1907 and 1967) the finalists were declared joint winners. In 1991 the final match between Cornwall and Yorkshire was tied at full-time and extra time was played, with Cornwall winning 29–20.
In 2001 the Championship did not take place due to the 2001 United Kingdom foot-and-mouth outbreak; instead Yorkshire and Cornwall were invited to play at Twickenham.

The 2015 final was contested by Lancashire and Cornwall, with the teams meeting in the final for the third consecutive year. Cornwall won the championship with an 18-13 victory, their fourth title overall and their first since 1999. Cornwall retained their title in 2016, this time beating Cheshire, 35–13. In 2017 Cornwall and Lancashire met in the final for the fourth time in five seasons. Lancashire won 19-8 and prevented Cornwall from completing a hat-trick of county titles.

Structure
There was little formal structure to the first official years of the competition, with teams playing different numbers of matches and different opposition from across England. The winners were determined by a panel of judges from the RFU Committee. From 1891–1895, the four winners of four regional Championships (North East, North West, South East and South West) played a round-robin tournament to determine the overall winner of the County Championship.

A restructure in 1896, led to the creation of North and South regions only, the winners of these regional competitions playing a final for the County Championship. Another restructure in 1921 saw the formation of five regions and the knock-out stage of the championship extend to semi-finals and a final. The winners of the North East, North West and South East regions were entered into a semi-final draw along with the winners of a play-off between the winners of the South and South West regions.

From 2007 to 2016, the top eight counties were split into two regions of four teams, North and South, who played a round-robin tournament. The winners of each region competed for the English County Championship in the final. This format was repeated for the eight counties that competed for the County Championship Plate. The eleven counties which competed for the County Championship Shield were split into three pools from which the winners and the runner-up with the best record met in semi-final matches.

In 2017 the competition was given a new structure, with the top tier comprising twelve teams and the second and third tiers having eight teams each. Each tier has a final each year, but promotion and relegation between tiers is decided on a two-year basis.

Past winners

1889-1895

1896-1983

1984-present

Since 1984 all Championship finals have been played at Twickenham.

Championships by county

Cumbria, a 1974 amalgamation of the former counties of Cumberland, Westmorland, and the Furness part of Lancashire, is shown separately from Cumberland and Lancashire.

Eastern Counties and Notts, Lincs & Derby have reached the final but have never won the championship.

Gloucestershire are the only county to have completed a "hat-trick of tat-trick" of  county titles: 1920,1921 & 1922; 1930,1931 & 1932; 1974,1975 & 1976.

John Fidler, former Gloucester, Gloucestershire and England lock forward, still holds the record for the most County Championship Final appearances, nine in all, from 1971 to 1984.

References

External links
 http://countyrugby.com/index.html
 https://web.archive.org/web/20081113051546/http://www.rfu.com/index.cfm/fuseaction/RFUHome.Community_Detail/StoryID/19903

 
Rugby union competitions in England
Recurring sporting events established in 1889
1889 establishments in England